Antoine Cuissard (19 July 1924 – 3 November 1997) was a French football midfielder and manager.

References

External links
 
 
 Profile 

1924 births
1997 deaths
Footballers from Saint-Étienne
French footballers
France international footballers
Association football midfielders
French football managers
FC Lorient players
AS Saint-Étienne players
AS Cannes players
OGC Nice players
Stade Rennais F.C. players
1954 FIFA World Cup players
Stade Rennais F.C. managers
FC Lorient managers
AC Ajaccio managers
Sportspeople from Lorient
Footballers from Brittany